MA Doom: Son of Yvonne is the fourth solo studio album by American rapper Masta Ace. The beats on the album are sourced from the Special Herbs series of instrumental mixtapes by MF Doom; Doom did not directly collaborate with Masta Ace in the production of this album outside of giving Ace his blessing to use the beats. Doom, however, makes a vocal appearance on the song "Think I Am", alongside fellow guest star Big Daddy Kane. Other guests on the album include Pav Bundy, Reggie B and Milani the Artist. The album was released on July 17, 2012, via M3 Records and Fat Beats Records.

Concept
Son of Yvonne is a concept album dedicated to Masta Ace's departed mother. It follows a short story of Masta Ace's upbringing.

Track listing
All tracks produced by MF Doom.

References

2012 albums
Masta Ace albums
MF Doom albums